Neurolaeneae is a tribe of flowering plants in the subfamily Asteroideae of the family Asteraceae.

Neurolaeneae genera recognized by the Global Compositae Database as of April 2022:
Calea 
Enydra 
Greenmaniella 
Heptanthus 
Neurolaena 
Staurochlamys 
Unxia

References

 
Asteraceae tribes